The Mohmand Expeditions were two British-Indian military expeditions to the North-West Frontier Province in Pakistan.

References

Military expeditions
History of Pakistan
 Mohmand campaigns